Reynaldo Romel Hill (born August 28, 1982) is an American former college and professional football player who was a cornerback in the National Football League (NFL) for four seasons during the early 2000s.  Hill played college football for the University of Florida, and thereafter, he played professionally for the Tennessee Titans of the NFL and the Omaha Nighthawks of the United Football League (UFL).

Early years 

Hill was born in Pahokee, Florida in 1982.  He attended Stranahan High School in Fort Lauderdale, Florida, where he played high school football for the Stranahan Dragons.

College career 

Hill attended Dodge City Community College in Dodge City, Kansas, before accepting an athletic scholarship to transfer to the University of Florida in Gainesville, Florida.  As a sophomore at Dodge City Community College, he led the NJCAA with twenty-two passes defensed, and added 57 tackles, three interceptions, two  returned kickoffs and one returned punt for touchdowns.  As a freshman, Hill had forty-five tackles, six interceptions, two fumble recoveries and fifteen breakups.  He was a significant contributor to the Dodge City Community College secondary that was ranked first in the nation among junior colleges, and also returned fourteen punts for eighty-nine yards and scored two touchdowns.  Hill also ran track at Dodge City Community College and ranked fifth nationally in the 200 meter dash his sophomore year.

While attending Florida, Hill played for coach Ron Zook's Florida Gators football team in 2003 and 2004.  He appeared in twenty-five games in his two seasons as a Gator, and started in twelve during his senior season in 2004.  He totaled fifty-seven tackles, one interception, and nine passes defensed throughout his college career. He was named to the Super Sleeper Team by the NFL Draft Report prior to the 2005 NFL Draft.

Professional career 

Before the 2005 NFL Draft, Hill was not invited to participate at the NFL Scouting Combine.  At the University of Florida's Pro Day, Hill posted a 40-yard dash time of 4.32 seconds and a 37.5-inch vertical leap, which rated among the top ten performances at the 2005 combine.

Tennessee Titans
After competing for a roster spot among a group of talented, young defensive backs in the Titans training camp, Hill took over the starting position midway through the 2005 NFL season and started the remaining ten games of the year. Hill showcased his play-making abilities by leading the team with three interceptions and tied for most interceptions among NFL rookie defensive backs. Hill scored his first career touchdown on a 52-yard interception that he returned for a touchdown against the Oakland Raiders. During the 2005 season, Hill started ten of the fifteen games in which he played, ending the season as the Titans interception leader with three, including one for a touchdown, and had forty-eight tackles. During the 2006 season, Hill started fourteen of fifteen games he played, ending the season with a career-high fifty-six total tackles and two interceptions.

In 2007, Hill started just two games after losing his starting job.  In 2008, his role as a backup cornerback. After two seasons of declining playing time, Hill became a free agent.

Omaha Nighthawks 

Hill was drafted in the first round (second pick overall) by the Omaha Nighthawks of the United Football League on June 29, 2011.

Personal life 

Reynaldo married his wife Janina in 2009. They have two children together, Reynaldo Hill Jr. and Caden Hill.

See also 

 History of the Tennessee Titans
 List of Florida Gators in the NFL Draft

References 

1982 births
Living people
American football cornerbacks
Florida Gators football players
Omaha Nighthawks players
People from Pahokee, Florida
Players of American football from Fort Lauderdale, Florida
Tennessee Titans players
Dodge City Conquistadors football players